False Colors may refer to:
 False Colors (1943 film), an American Western film
 False Colors (1914 film), an American silent drama film
 False colors

See also
 False Colours, a novel by Georgette Heyer